David Hey Bratton (October, 1869 – December 3, 1904) was an American water polo player and competition swimmer who represented the United States at the 1904 Summer Olympics in St. Louis, Missouri.

Bratton was sponsored by the New York Athletic Club (NYAC) at the time of the 1904 Olympics, and was a member of NYAC Olympic water polo team that won the 1904 gold medal.  He was also a member of the NYAC team in the men's 4x50-yard freestyle relay which finished fourth in the Olympic final.

Bratton was born in New York City.  Following the 1904 Olympics, he died of a typhoid fever in Chicago that same year.

References

External links
profile

1869 births
1904 deaths
American male water polo players
American male freestyle swimmers
Olympic gold medalists for the United States in water polo
Olympic swimmers of the United States
Water polo players at the 1904 Summer Olympics
Medalists at the 1904 Summer Olympics
Swimmers at the 1904 Summer Olympics